Myriam Sirois (born February 2, 1975) is a Canadian actress, mainly known for being the voice of Akane Tendo in the English version of Ranma ½. She also portrayed Sarah Cantrell in the Babylon 5 movie The Legend of the Rangers: To Live and Die in Starlight. She also played the voice of Zoey in Rudolph the Red-Nosed Reindeer: The Movie and the voice of Sulia Gaudeamus in Fatal Fury: The Motion Picture.

External links 

1975 births
Living people
Actresses from Quebec
Canadian television actresses
Canadian voice actresses
People from Sept-Îles, Quebec